Agnes Stefania Malmsten, born October 16, 1967 in Huddinge, is a Swedish art director, graphic designer, film producer and child actor.

Career
Malmsten was born to Bodil Malmsten (1944-2016) and Peter Csihas (1945-2011) in Huddinge, a municipality in Stockholm County in east central Sweden.

She is one of the founders of the magazines Pop and Bibel, followed by a position as art director of Vogue Hommes International in Paris. 

She has also worked on the design of books and catalogs, graphics for films, and brand identities and campaigns. Malmsten received the Berling Prize, for 2006. She was the creative director of fashion and culture magazine Rodeo, between 2012 and 2015. She is a senior lecturer in Visual Communication at Beckmans College of Design and a board member of Malmstenbutiken in Stockholm.

Malmsten Hellberg
In July 2013, Stefania Malmsten and Ulrika Hellberg founded a design studio, Malmsten Hellberg. They used to work in the intersection between fashion and art, where they already have an established network both locally in Sweden and internationally. Their clients include BACK, Färgfabriken, The Hasselblad Foundation, IKEA, Moderna Museet and Story.

References

External links
 
 

1967 births
Living people
Swedish graphic designers
Women graphic designers
20th-century Swedish artists
20th-century Swedish women artists
21st-century Swedish artists
21st-century Swedish women artists
People from Huddinge Municipality